Abu Othaina, popularly known as Shabjdeed is a rapper from Kafr 'Aqab, East Palestine. Based in Ramallah, he has become an influential figure in underground Palestinian hip hop.

Style 
Shabjdeed's lyrics often deal with conflicts between the Israeli Occupying Forces and the Palestinians. His use of the Arabic language is characterized as playful, using alliteration and rhyming to create a unique style. His delivery has been described as a "constant overflow of words that fills every corner of a track." His rapping has been characterized as having a thick accent.

He cites the Ramallah rap collective Saleb Wahed as a major source of inspiration.

BLTNM 
Along with Al-Nather and Shabmouri, he is a part of BLTNM, pronounced "blatinum", in reference to Platinum Records in Dubai and the fact that there's no P phoneme in Arabic. The group participated in a campaign for Burberry August 2020.

The critic Ma'an Abu Taleb named Shabjdeed and Al Nather's 2019 track "Mtaktak" for a list of the "greatest hip-hop songs of all time" published by the BBC.

Discography

Studio Albums 

 Carlo (2017)
 Hmlana (2018)
 Jdeed vol.1 (2019)
 Jdeed vol.2 (2019)
 Jdeed vol.3 (2019)
 Adina (2019)
 Sindibad al Ward (2019)

References 

Palestinian rappers